Ashghal is the Public Works Authority of Qatar headquartered in Al Dafna, Doha. Ashghal was established based on the Emiri Decree issued by the Father Emir Sheikh Hamad bin Khalifa Al Thani on 20 January 2004, as an autonomous body to design, deliver and manage all infrastructure related projects as well as public amenities of the State.  Ashghal is responsible for the construction and maintenance of local roads, drainage systems, highways and public buildings like mosques, schools, hospital, health centers, parks, etc.

Organizational structure
The current president of Ashghal is H.E. Dr. Eng. Saad Ahmed Al Mohannadi.

Ashghal's business units consist of five major affairs: 
 
 Infrastructure Affairs
 Asset Affairs
 Buildings Affairs
 Technical Support Affairs
 Shared Services Affairs

Programmes 

Ashghal currently has the following key programmes:

 The Expressway Programme
 The Local Roads & Drainage Programme

Responsibilities
Ashghal is responsible for building infrastructure facilities for the 2022 FIFA World Cup hosted by Qatar. The Arab country plans to spend up to $100 billion in infrastructure projects between 2013 and 2022. Various companies like CH2M Hill, KBR, and Parsons Brinckerhoff are associated with many of Ashghal's projects.

Criticisms 
Ashghal has been awarded many contracts and infrastructure projects contributing to preparations for the 2022 World Cup in Doha. Qatar has received a substantial amount of criticism and controversy surrounding their World Cup bid, most of which surrounds the treatment labor workers hired for infrastructure projects. Reports from multiple sources estimated that roughly 4000 migrant workers would lose their lives in the building process, many of them unaccounted for, one estimate claiming at least one worker a day would die. Sharan Burrow, of the International Trade Union Confederation claimed that the workers were "basically slaves", claiming that "the Qatari government [has] no commitment to human rights".

On 30 August 2020, General Secretary of ITUC Sharan Burrow, accepted the changes and said that Qatar has regularized its industrial relations system and dismantled the systematic power imbalance between workers and employers. These changes are a break with the past and offer a future for migrant workers in Qatar underpinned by laws which respect workers, along with grievance and remedy systems. According to the reports more than 400,000 people have directly benefited from the new minimum wage, improvements to the wage protection system now protect 96% of eligible workers from wage abuse, and hundreds of thousands of workers have left Qatar and returned without permission from their employer since exit permits were introduced. These statistics illustrate the impact of Qatar's reforms in the report drafted by the guardian on 22 November 2021. The Worker’s Support and Insurance Fund, established in 2019, has disbursed QAR 358,000,000 (nearly USD 100m) to over 35,000 workers, as of March 2022 revealed by ILO. The online complaints platform has increased workers’ access to the Ministry of Labour. The number of complaints was nearly 25,000 in 2021, compared to 11,000 in the previous year. For the first time in the Gulf region, migrant workers are being elected as representatives in the workplace. As of March 2022, 228 workers’ representatives were elected to represent almost 40,000 employees in 37 enterprises. Platforms have been established to elevate the priorities and discussions that emerge from individual joint committees to the main contractor level, at the sectoral level and at the national level was carried out in the same ILO report. New legislation was adopted to protect workers from heat stress during the summer months, with the expansion of summertime working hours during which outdoor work is prohibited. There is also a threshold for stopping outdoor work, regardless of the time of day or year. To supplement the protections in the Domestic Workers Law, a new standard employment contract for domestic workers has been adopted. Awareness raising materials on domestic workers’ rights under the Law have been disseminated, and networks of domestic workers have been established.

References

External links
Ashghal web site

Government agencies of Qatar